De'Mon is a given name. Notable people with the name include:

De'Mon Brooks (born 1992), American basketball player
De'Mon Glanton (born 1986), American football player

See also
Damon (given name)

Masculine given names